Javier Hernández Maradiaga (born May 8, 1988) is a Honduran swimmer, who specialized in butterfly events. He represented his nation Honduras at the 2008 Summer Olympics, and has currently owned a Central American record in the 200 m butterfly. Hernandez also spent his college career in the United States as a member of the Lindenwood Lions swimming and diving team under head coach Craig Penrose, while pursuing his major in business administration at Lindenwood University in St. Charles, Missouri.

Hernandez received a Universality invitation from FINA to compete as Honduras' lone male swimmer in the men's 200 m butterfly at the 2008 Summer Olympics in Beijing. Hernandez fired off a 2:02.23 on a high-tech bodysuit to blast a new Honduran record, but could not catch Peru's Emmanuel Crescimbeni to get the fourth spot by just a tenth of a second (0.1), dropping him back to dead-last in the opening heat, and rounding out the roster to forty-second overall in the prelims. In 2015, Hernandez finished 2nd in the country in SIRVA overall with an impressive 4.73 average out of 5.

References

External links
Profile – Lindenwood Lions
NBC Olympics Profile

1988 births
Living people
Honduran male swimmers
Olympic swimmers of Honduras
Swimmers at the 2008 Summer Olympics
Male butterfly swimmers
People from Puerto Cortés
21st-century Honduran people